Madougou  is a village and commune and seat of the Cercle of Koro in the Mopti Region of Mali. In 1998 the commune had a population of 24,600.

References

Communes of Mopti Region